The iPhone XR (stylized and marketed as iPhone Xʀ; Roman numeral "X" pronounced "ten") is a smartphone designed and manufactured by Apple Inc. It is part of the twelfth generation of the iPhone, alongside the higher-end iPhone XS/XS Max models. Pre-orders began on October 19, 2018, with an official release on October 26, 2018. The iPhone XR is the least expensive device in Apple's twelfth generation of iPhones, which also includes the iPhone XS and XS Max, and was therefore considered an "affordable flagship" or "budget flagship" phone at its release.

The XR shares key internal hardware but with features removed/downgraded to reduce the price. The XR features the same processor as the XS and XS Max, the Apple A12 Bionic chip built with a 7 nanometer process, which Apple claims to be the "smartest and most powerful chip" ever put into a smartphone. Instead of the OLED screen on the XS, the XR has a 6.1-inch Liquid Retina LED-backlit LCD IPS panel display, which Apple claims is the "most advanced LCD in the industry." According to Apple, the full charge of the XR battery lasts up to one-and-a-half hours longer than that of its direct predecessor, the iPhone 8 Plus.

The iPhone XR was available in six colors: black, white, blue, yellow, coral (a shade of pink and orange), and Product Red. It is the second iPhone to be released in white, yellow and blue, the first being the iPhone 5C in 2013. Internationally, the phone supports dual SIMs through a Nano-SIM and an eSIM. In mainland China, Hong Kong, and Macau, dual Nano-SIM (in a single tray) is offered instead. The iPhone XR was available in three storage capacities: 64 GB, 128 GB, and 256 GB. The 256 GB version was discontinued with the release of the iPhone 11 and 11 Pro; while the iPhone XS was discontinued and replaced by the iPhone 11 Pro, the iPhone XR continued on sale at a lower price point with the iPhone 11 succeeding as the "affordable flagship".

The iPhone XR was Apple's best selling 2018 model. It also became the top-selling and the most popular smartphone globally in Q3 2019. As of September 2020, the iPhone XR has sold 77.4 million units worldwide, making it the eighth best-selling smartphone of all time.

In 2019, Apple started assembling the iPhone XR in India. The iPhone XR as well as the iPhone 12 Pro with its Max variant were discontinued and removed from Apple's website after the announcement of the iPhone 13 and iPhone 13 Pro on September 14, 2021, but is still available through third party retailers today.

History 
The iPhone XR was announced by Phil Schiller on September 12, 2018, at the Steve Jobs Theater in the Apple Park campus, alongside the higher-priced iPhone XS and XS Max.

Design

Hardware 
The XR has a similar design to the iPhone X and iPhone XS. However, it has slightly larger bezels, a bigger screen, an aluminum frame, and is available in a wide variety of colors. Similar to other X-branded iPhones, all models come with a black front. The XR has an IP67 rating for dust and water resistance, which means it can be immersed in 1-metre deep water for up to 30 minutes.

Released as part of the same twelfth generation, the XR has similar hardware to the XS, but with a few features removed to reduce the price. The XR features the same system-on-chip (SoC) as the XS and XS Max, the Apple A12 Bionic chip built with a 7 nanometer
process.

The XR has an LCD display known as "Liquid Retina" instead of the OLED screen used on the X, XS, and XS Max. The display on the XR has a resolution of 1792 × 828 pixels and a pixel density of 326 ppi, compared with 458 ppi on other X-branded iPhones. However, it has 120 Hz Touch Sample Rate which is the same as the XS and XS Max. Instead of 3D Touch, the XR comes with Haptic Touch where the user long-presses until they feel a vibration from the Taptic Engine. The screen-to-body ratio of the XR is 79.3%, much higher than the 67.5% of the iPhone 8 Plus but is still lower than most other phones in its price category.

Unlike other phones in the X-series, the XR ships with a single camera on the rear on the phone, featuring exactly the same main camera sensor as on the XS and XS Max, utilizing a 1/2.55" sensor size and 1.4μm pixel size. Unlike the XS, it does not have optical zoom because of the single camera. DxOMark gave the camera on the iPhone XR a rating of 101, giving the title "Top-ranked single-lens phone". Despite the rear single-camera setup, a modified version of Portrait Mode is included. It works unaltered while using the TrueDepth front camera, but with the rear camera, it attempts to calculate the depth of field using a combination of the focus pixels on the image sensor and AI, resulting in more limitations including lower resolution depth data and subjects not being close enough due to the wide-angle lens being used instead of the missing telephoto lens. Just like the iPhone XS and XS Max, the iPhone XR also offers an adjustable depth of field through software, allowing the user to adjust the background bokeh effect after taking a photo.

Software 

The XR initially shipped with iOS 12 installed out of the box and is compatible with iOS 13, which was released to the public on September 19, 2019. It received iOS 14 on September 16, 2020 and iOS 15 on September 20, 2021, and received iOS 16 on September 12, 2022.

Controversy

Display 
Some online media outlets criticized the iPhone XR's display for having a low resolution and a low pixel per inch density, relative to other phones on the market at the time of release at the price point. However, other online media outlets ignored these concerns, saying that under normal use, users should not be able to discern the pixels.

Power adapter and EarPods 
Apple, as part of an environmental initiative, removed the EarPods and power adapter from all new iPhone boxes starting in October 2020, including the iPhone XR. It is claimed that removing these items will reduce e-waste and permit a smaller iPhone box, allowing more devices to be shipped simultaneously to decrease carbon footprint. Apple now includes a USB-C to Lightning cable, which is compatible with increasingly prevalent USB-C charging sources, but incompatible with the previous (and currently more common) USB-A power adapter that Apple included with its devices, leading to Apple recommending users who don't have a USB-C based charging source to use existing USB-A to Lightning cables or buying a USB-C power adapter separately.

Notes

See also 
 List of iOS devices
 History of iPhone
 List of best-selling mobile phones
 Timeline of iPhone models

References

External links 
 
 – official site

IOS
Computer-related introductions in 2018
Mobile phones introduced in 2018
 
Mobile phones with 4K video recording
Discontinued flagship smartphones